Keep Me In Mind is an original game-novel based on the U.S. television series Buffy the Vampire Slayer.  This is the second in the line of Buffy books called Stake Your Destiny, modeled after the popular Choose Your Own Adventure series in which the reader decides the fate of the characters.  There are more than a dozen possible endings.

Plot summary
Ethan Rayne comes back to Sunnydale and releases an evil sorcerer from Bavaria who had been imprisoned since the Middle Ages. At the same time Buffy seems to be finding herself up against a number of old adversaries out for revenge.

2005 American novels
Books based on Buffy the Vampire Slayer
Gamebooks